is a UK insolvency law case concerning the duties of a receiver and manager in the United Kingdom, over and above a duty of good faith, as to the manner in which he conducts a business.

Facts
Medforth conducted pig farming on a large scale, with a £2 million annual turnover and a herd of 3000 sows, 120 boars and 11000 weaners. His bank appointed receivers who ran the business from February 1984 to September 1988, when Medforth found a new source of finance and repaid the bank.  Medforth advised the receivers that they could get large discounts from foodstuffs suppliers, amounting to £1000 a week, which he had previously been able to obtain, but the receivers did not attempt to obtain any such discount until early 1988. In February 1990, Medforth sued them for failure to obtain such commercial discounts either as breach of a duty of care, or if the only duty was that of good faith, such a breach (even though it did not arise from any deceit or of any conscious or deliberate impropriety).

In the Queen's Bench Division, McGonigal J ruled:

the Receivers, when exercising their power of sale, owed Mr Medforth, over and above a duty of good faith, an equitable duty of care,
the standard of that duty of care was the standard of a reasonably competent receiver
no sensible distinction could be drawn between the exercise of a power of sale and the exercise of a power to manage a business, that the power to manage was ancillary to the power of sale and that the equitable duty of care was applicable to both

The receivers appealed to the Court of Appeal.

Judgment
The Court of Appeal dismissed the receivers' appeal and held that the duty of care in equity was breached. Scott VC, drawing upon jurisprudence established in such prior cases as Cuckmere Brick Co v Mutual Finance and Downsview Nominees Ltd v First City Corporation Ltd, summarised the law as follows.

However, McGonigal J's ruling, while essentially correct, required some minor qualifications:

 the power to manage a business is independent of the power to sell, but, in the management of the business, an equitable duty of care is owed
 the breach of a duty of good faith should, in this area as in all others, require some dishonesty or improper motive, or some other element of bad faith, to be established

Swinton Thomas LJ and Tuckey LJ concurred.

Significance
Medforth revised the position previously taken by the Privy Council in Downsview Nominees, where a receiver's duty of care to the company was limited to a requirement that he take reasonable steps to obtain a proper price on the exercise of his power of sale. The Court of Appeal effectively stated that:

 a receiver owes an equitable duty of skill and care to the debtor company, should he decide to continue trading,
 so long as this does not conflict with his fiduciary duty to act in the interests of the debentureholder.

See also

UK insolvency law

Notes

References
 
 
 

United Kingdom insolvency case law
Court of Appeal (England and Wales) cases
1999 in case law
1999 in British law